Pathway or pathways may refer to:

Entertainment
The Pathway (novel), a 1914 work by Gertrude Page
The Pathway, a 2001 album by Officium Triste
 Pathway (album), by the Flaming Stars
 Pathways (album) (2010), by the Dave Holland Octet
 Pathway (comics), a superhero featured in Marvel comics
 Pathways (band), an American progressive metalcore band

Organizations
 Pathways Foundation, an Australian non-profit organisation
 Pathways out of Poverty, a workforce programme in the U.S.

Schools
 Pathway Academy, a charter school in Jacksonville, Florida
 Pathways Academy, Detroit school serving students who are pregnant or new mothers, closed

Others
 NHS Pathways, triage software used by the National Health Service of the United Kingdom
 Pathway Intermediates Limited, company producing biosurfactants
 Pathway Studios, a North London recording studio
 Pathway commons, a database of biological pathways and interactions

See also 
 A trail, an unpaved lane or road
 Career Pathways, a workforce development strategy
 Clinical pathway, systemised approach to medical treatment
 Genetic pathway, a group of interacting genes
 Pathway analysis
 Metabolic pathway, a series of cellular chemical reactions
 Signalling pathway or Signal transduction, a series of interactions to affect gene expression
 Neural pathway
 Dopaminergic pathways, neural pathways in the brain which transmit dopamine
 Path (disambiguation)